Chris André Jespersen (born 18 October 1983) is a Norwegian cross-country skier who has competed since 2002. His best World Cup finishes were second in a 30 km event in Davos in 2013, and second in the 2013–14 Tour de Ski. Jespersen's lone win was in the 4 × 10 km relay in 2008, also in Sweden.

Jespersen represented Norway at the 2014 Winter Olympics in Sochi, Russia. He competed in the 15 km, finishing sixth, the 50 km, finishing 32nd, and in the 4 × 10 km relay, finishing fourth. Their fourth place finish was subsequently upgraded to a bronze medal following the disqualification of the Russian team. During the 15 km time trial, Jespersen came to international attention when, in addition to wearing a short-sleeved top, he opted to cut his ski tights off at the thigh and race with bare legs. Although temperatures at the games were often uncharacteristically mild, the incongruous sight of a winter athlete skiing in shorts and a t-shirt was remarked on by commentators and audiences worldwide.

Cross-country skiing results
All results are sourced from the International Ski Federation (FIS).

Olympic Games

World Championships

World Cup

Season standings

Individual podiums

1 victory – (1 ) 
6 podiums – (3 , 3 )

Team podiums

 1 victory – (1 ) 
 3 podiums – (3 )

References

External links

1983 births
Living people
Norwegian male cross-country skiers
Tour de Ski skiers
Olympic cross-country skiers of Norway
Cross-country skiers at the 2014 Winter Olympics
People from Hordaland
Sportspeople from Vestland